The 2016 World Wrestling Olympic Qualification Tournament 2 was the second of two worldwide qualification tournaments for the 2016 Olympics. Competitors at this tournament failed to qualify for the Olympics at the 2015 World Wrestling Championships, at their respective regional qualifier, or at the 2016 World Wrestling Olympic Qualification Tournament 1.  The top two competitors in each weight class qualified.

It was held between 6–8 May 2016 in Istanbul, Turkey.

Men's freestyle

57 kg
8 May

65 kg
8 May

 Following the disqualification of Andriy Kviatkovskyi at the European Qualification Tournament, his spot went to Zurabi Iakobishvili from Georgia. Borislav Novachkov earns the Olympic quota won by Georgia in Mongolia. Following this adjustment, as Novachkov takes his license from the 1st World Qualifier his quota transferred to Frank Molinaro.

74 kg
8 May

86 kg
8 May

97 kg
8 May

125 kg
8 May

Men's Greco-Roman

59 kg
6 May

66 kg
6 May

75 kg
6 May

85 kg
6 May

98 kg
6 May

130 kg
6 May

Women's freestyle

48 kg
7 May

53 kg
7 May

58 kg
7 May

63 kg
7 May

69 kg
7 May

75 kg
7 May

References

External links
United World Wrestling

Qualification
Olympic Qualification Tournament
Wrestling
Wrestling
Sport in Istanbul